The University of Oregon (UO, U of O or Oregon) is a public research university in Eugene, Oregon. Founded in 1876, the institution is well known for its strong ties to the sports apparel and marketing firm Nike, Inc, and its co-founder, billionaire Phil Knight. UO is also known for serving as the filming location for the 1978 cult classic National Lampoon's Animal House.<ref>{{cite web |last1=Warsinskey |first1=Tim |title=From "Bluto" to "Pre, there's no ducking University of Oregon's unique history and beauty |url=https://www.cleveland.com/osu/2015/01/from_bluto_to_pre_theres_no_du.html |website=Cleveland.com |date=January 8, 2015 |access-date=5 August 2022}}</ref> UO's 295-acre campus is situated along the Willamette River. The school also has a satellite campus in Portland; a marine station, called the Oregon Institute of Marine Biology, in Charleston; and an observatory, called Pine Mountain Observatory, in Central Oregon. UO's colors are green and yellow.

The University of Oregon is organized into nine colleges and schools: the College of Arts and Sciences, Charles H. Lundquist College of Business, College of Design, College of Education, Robert D. Clark Honors College, School of Journalism and Communication; School of Law; School of Music and Dance; and the Division of Graduate Studies. Furthermore, UO offers 316 undergraduate and graduate degree programs. Most academic programs follow the 10 week Quarter System. The university is classified among "R1: Doctoral Universities – Very high research activity" and is a member of the Association of American Universities. Since July 2014, UO has been governed by its own board of trustees.

UO student athletes compete as the Ducks and are part of the Pac-12 Conference in the National Collegiate Athletic Association (NCAA). With eighteen varsity teams, the Oregon Ducks are best known for their football team and track and field program. These two teams are even incorporated into the design of the school's "O" logo. In the summer of 2022, UO hosted the 2022 World Athletics Championships. It was the first time the event was held in the United States.

UO has a long and complex relationship with Nike, Inc., and the firm's co-founder Phil Knight. As a consquence of state higher-education disinvestment starting in the 1990s, UO has embraced a "University of Nike" image. Fueled by large investments in athletic infrastructure, this trend has accelerated in recent years. Knight, an alumnus, has advocated for both athletic prominence and increased privatisation of the university, and has donated over $1 billion to UO since the late-1980s. The school's "O" logo was designed by Nike in 1998 and sports facility projects on campus typically involve both Knight and Nike.

History
 The land 
The University of Oregon is located on Kalapuya ilihi, the traditional indigenous homeland of the Kalapuya people. Following treaties between 1851 and 1855, Kalapuya people were dispossessed of their indigenous homeland by the United States government and forcibly removed to the Coast Indian Reservation in Western Oregon. Today, Kalapuya descendants are primarily citizens of the Confederated Tribes of Grand Ronde and the Confederated Tribes of Siletz Indians.

 Motto 
The university's motto, mens agitat molem translates from Latin as "mind moves mass", or poetically as "minds move mountains." The line comes from the Aeneid by Virgil, Book VI, line 727.

The motto mens agitat molem is now shared with the Eindhoven University of Technology (Technische Universiteit Eindhoven) founded in 1956, the Military Academy of the German Armed Forces (Führungsakademie der Bundeswehr) founded in 1957, the University of Warwick founded in 1965.

Early years

Despite state funding woes, the Oregon State Legislature established the university on October 12, 1872, and named it Oregon State University. The residents of Eugene struggled to help finance the institution, holding numerous fundraising events such as strawberry festivals, church socials, and produce sales. They raised $27,500, enough to buy eighteen acres of land at a cost of $2,500. The doors opened in 1876 with the name of "Oregon State University" and University Hall as its sole building. The first year of enrollment contained 155 students taught by five faculty members. The first graduating class was in 1878, graduating five students. In 1881, the university was nearly closed; it was $8,000 in debt before Henry Villard donated $7,000 to help pay it. In 1913 and 1932, there were proposals to merge the university with what is now Oregon State University. Both proposals were defeated.

Maturity as a university
During Prince Lucien Campbell's tenure as president from 1902 to 1925, the university experienced tremendous growth. The budget, enrollment, facilities, and faculty members all grew several times its amount prior to his presidency. Numerous schools were also established during his tenure, including the School of Music in 1902, the School of Education in 1910, the School of Architecture, the College of Business in 1914, the School of Law in 1915, the School of Journalism in 1916, and the School of Health and Physical Education in 1920. However, the University of Oregon lost its School of Engineering to Oregon Agricultural College, now known as Oregon State University.

In 1917, a "three term" (quarter system) calendar was adopted by the university faculty as a war-time measure. This academic calendar has remained ever since then. However, it is now referred to as the Quarter System.

The Zorn-MacPherson Bill in 1932 proposed the University of Oregon and Oregon State College (now "University") merge. The bill lost in a landslide vote of over 6 to 1. The University of Oregon Medical School was founded in 1887 in Portland and merged with Willamette University's program in 1913. However, in 1974 it became an independent institution known as Oregon Health Sciences University.

The Institute of Molecular Biology was established at the university in 1959.

UO served as the filming location for the 1978 cult classic National Lampoon's Animal House.

Golden age

The 60s and 70s were somewhat of a golden age for the university. In 1964, the university ranked 25th nationally in National Science Foundation basic research grants, ahead of the University of Rochester, Northwestern University, the University of Colorado and the University of Pittsburgh.

In 1969, the UO was admitted into the prestigious Association of American Universities, along with Case Western Reserve University, the University of Maryland, and the University of Southern California.

Graduate enrollment peaked during the 78-79 academic year at 4,568. From 1970 to 1979, 2,614 doctoral degrees were awarded at UO cumulatively.

From 1970 to 1979, 817 UO undergraduate students would go on to earn doctoral degrees at UO or another institution. Despite increases in total undergraduate enrollment since the 60s and 70s, fewer UO undergraduate students would go on to earn doctorates in the 80s, 90s, 2000s and 2010s. This demonstrates the strength of UO's undergraduate student body during the 60s and 70s.

Prominent UO researchers of this era include Michael Posner, Frank Stahl, George Streisinger and Aaron Novick..

UO experienced state disinvestment in the 1980s during the tenure of president Paul Olum. Further state disinvestment occurred during the 1990s and during the Great Recession. Many programs have been scaled back or eliminated.

Recent history
The university occupies over 80 buildings. In recent years there have been numerous construction projects on campus. These projects were commissioned in part to support current student enrollment as well as possible future increases.

UO has deteriorated academically since the 1970s, due to budget cuts and mismanagement. In recent years UO's administration and Board of Trustees have approved hundreds of millions of dollars in construction projects that are not related to the university's academic mission. These facilities include Matthew Knight arena, the Ford Alumni Center, the EMU renovation (student union building), and lavish dormitories. This has occurred in tandem with state budget reductions, tuition increases, and ballooning out of state enrolment.  

In 2016, the university removed the name of Frederic Stanley Dunn, head of the Classics department in the 1920s and 30s, from a dormitory named after him, "Dunn Hall", because of his leading role in the Ku Klux Klan.

UO hosted the 2022 World Championships in Athletics.

Declining state support
Measure 5 established limits on property taxes in Oregon. This impacted the state budget, and lead to budget and programmatic cuts at UO starting the 1990s. The College of Human Performance and Development was closed. Furthermore, many of the school's primary and secondary teacher training programs were eliminated. By 1997, more than 20 other programs were closed or significantly reduced in size.

 

UO has initiated three capital campaigns in the last 30 years. The first campaign of this era was launched with a goal of $150 million. It ended up raising a total of $255.3 million between 1992 and 1998.

With financial support from the state dwindling from 40% to 13% of the university budget, in January 2001, University President Dave Frohnmayer began Campaign Oregon with the goal of raising $600 million by December 2008, the most ambitious philanthropic fundraising campaign in the state's history at the time. With contributions exceeding $100 million from benefactors such as Phil Knight and Lorry I. Lokey, the campaign goal was exceeded by over $253 million.

In the fall of 2014 the institution announced that it would attempt to raise $2 billion from donors. This campaign's quiet-phase began in 2010, and $700 million was raised before the campaign was announced to the public. This number was revised to $3 billion in the fall of 2018.

In October 2016, it was announced Phil Knight and his wife Penny will contribute $500 million to establish the Phil and Penny Knight Campus for Accelerating Scientific Impact. The donation will be dispersed over a ten-year period. At the time it was the largest donation to a public research university. Knight gave an additional $500 million to the Knight Campus in 2021. In 2022, Steve Ballmer made a large gift of $425 million to fund a new institute for children's behavioral health. UO's recent gifts are among the largest in higher education history. All gifts were received during Schill's tenure as president.

Despite the recent influx in private gifts given by mega-donors, as of 2020, UO's state subsidy per resident student is one of the lowest in both the Association of American Universities and Pac-12 Conference. These recent gifts are earmarked for specific purposes and do not subsidize the university at large. For comparisons sake, the university with the largest state subsidy per resident student in the AAU is Georgia Tech. Their subsidy on a per resident student basis is roughly six times larger than UO's. Additionally, the university with largest subsidy per resident student in the Pac-12 Conference is the University of Utah. Their subsidy on a per resident student basis is four and a half times larger than UO's.

UO has raised over $4.75 billion in support since 1992 through fundraising and other activities.

"University of Nike"
The school's "O" logo was officially adopted by the university as a whole in 2002. Designed by Nike, it was first adopted by the athletic program in late-1998. The inside of the logo is said to depict Hayward Field, the institution's track and field venue. The outside of the logo is said to represent Autzen Stadium, which is UO's football stadium.

Phil Knight has financed hundreds of millions of dollars worth of construction projects on UO's campus going back to the late-1980s. Knight contributed to the renovation and expansion of the Main Library, now called the Knight Library, and the construction of the William W. Knight Law Center. Knight did not make a major contribution to academics between 1996 and 2016.

Knight is widely known in the sports world as a prominent athletic booster. Knight also has contributed to, and managed, the construction of various athletic department facilities. Knight's involvement in said projects usually does not involve any university oversight, making them controversial. Knight also financed the majority of the Hayward Field renovation project, which cost over $270 million according to the UO Athletic Department.

Major publications including the New York Times and Wall Street Journal have described the university as the "University of Nike". A booked titled The University of Nike, written by Joshua Hunt, describes Nike and Phil Knight's influence on the university.

As of 2022, 16.5% of UO's gross square footage (based on building inventory) is purpose built for the university's NCAA sports program. UO's NCAA program currently occupies 1,492,802 gross square feet of building space. Many of these facilities are only accessible to student athletes.

Push for independence
In 2010, the newly installed UO president, Richard Lariviere, proposed establishing a new governance and funding model for UO. The New Partnership, as it became known, sought to establish an independent board and large endowment to fund the university into the future. Funding had become too low and unpredictable for UO officials, and the new model would provide the university with a consistent stream of funding and the legal freedom to borrow money for large capital projects. Lariviere's proposal called for $800 million in state bonds and "an equal amount" of private gifts. The new funds would provide a large boost to UO's then modest endowment.

In a 2010 interview, UO booster Phil Knight discussed the New Partnership. Knight explained that Lariviere's plan would allow UO greater control and possibly allow it to set its own tuition for in-state students.

Ultimately, the New Partnership failed. Lariviere was fired in late-2011. Neither the governance proposal or funding model was established during his presidency.

On March 31, 2012, a Political Action Committee called Oregonians For Higher Education Excellence was formed by Columbia Sportswear CEO Tim Boyle. As of May 23, 2012, the organization has raised over $320,000. Notable contributors to the PAC include, Phil Knight, Patrick Kilkenny, and Tim Boyle. According to Boyle, the PAC's stated goal was to help facilitate an increase in autonomy at the University of Oregon.

In reaction to a growing movement to establish an independent university board, the Oregon Legislature in 2013 passed SB 270, requiring local governing boards for the state's three largest institutions. Effective July 1, 2014, the University of Oregon became an independent public body governed by the Board of Trustees of the University of Oregon. Proponents of local governing boards believe an independent board will give the university more autonomy, and free it from relying on inadequate state funding.

On August 6, 2014, Michael R. Gottfredson resigned as president. In the summer of 2014, former UO president Robert Berdahl told the president of the university's board of trustees he believes UO risks losing its membership in the Association of American Universities. To address this growing concern, UO began preparing several initiatives which include a cluster-hire and a capital campaign.

On April 14, 2015, it was announced that Michael H. Schill would become the next president of the university. This was the board's first major move since the previous president resigned. Michael H. Schill became the university's president in the summer of 2015. In June 2015, UO's endowment surpassed the $700 million mark.

On August 11, 2022, it was announced that Michael H. Schill was leaving the university to become president at Northwestern University.

On August 16, 2022, the Board of Trustees of the University of Oregon voted unanimously to appoint Provost and Senior Vice President Patrick Phillips as interim president of the university during a special board meeting.

Academics

As of Fall 2014, UO offered 272 degree programs. The UO student body is composed of students from all 50 of the United States, the District of Columbia, two U.S. territories, and 89 countries around the world. As of Fall 2015, Pre-Business Administration was the most popular undergraduate major at UO (12.3% of all majors), followed by Psychology (6.4%), Human Physiology (5.3%), Economics (4.8%) and Business Administration (4.4%).

The University of Oregon is organized into nine colleges and schools.  UO's College of Arts and Sciences (CAS) covers a large array of departments in the arts and sciences. The School of Global Studies and Languages is embedded within CAS. The Charles H. Lundquist College of Business (LCB) was founded in 1884 and offers courses in fields such as accounting, decision sciences, entrepreneurship, finance, management, and marketing. The School of Accounting was established in 2017 to oversee the accounting program. The College of Design (COD) was founded by Ellis F. Lawrence in 1914. The college offers undergraduate and graduate degrees in design and policy related fields. The college was known as the School of Allied Arts and Architecture and was renamed in 2017. The college is divided into three schools: School of Architecture & Environment, School of Art + Design, and the School of Planning, Public Policy and Management. The College of Education (COE) was established in 1910 as the School of Education. The Robert D. Clark Honors College (CHC) is a small honors college intended to complement the majors in place at the university by joining select students and faculty for a low student to teacher ratio (25:1 maximum). The School of Journalism and Communication (SOJC) is one of the oldest journalism schools in the United States. The first journalism class was offered in 1901, and it began as a department in 1912, and became a professional school in 1916. The SOJC is located in Allen Hall on the University of Oregon's Eugene campus, and is named for the school's founder, newspaperman Eric Allen. The School of Law was formed in 1884 in Portland and moved to Eugene in early 1915. The School of Music and Dance (SOMD) was initially just the Department of Music in 1886, and developed into the School of Music in 1900.

The university previously had a medical school. The University of Oregon Medical School was founded in 1887 in Portland and merged with Willamette University's program in 1913. However, in 1974 it became an independent institution. It is now known as Oregon Health & Science University.

The university operates on the Quarter system with the exception of the law school, which operates on the Semester System. An academic quarter involves 10 weeks of classes and one week of exams. Minimum full-time study is 12 credits, which translates to 3 courses. Most full-time students will take four academic courses per quarter, or 15-17 credits. With advisor approval students may take up to 24 credits, which translates to approximately a maximum of 6 classes. If students successfully submit a petition to the Academic Requirements Committee they may take more than 24 credits.

Undergraduate admissions
The University of Oregon's undergraduate admissions process is "selective" according to U.S. News & World Report. For students entering Fall 2019, 22,329 freshmen were accepted out of 27,358 applicants, an 81.6% acceptance rate, and 4,525 enrolled for a yield of 20.3%.

Among freshman students who enrolled in fall 2019, SAT scores for the middle 50% ranged from 560 to 660 for evidence based reading and writing, and 540–650 for math. ACT composite scores for the middle 50% ranged from 22 to 28. The average high school GPA for incoming freshmen was 3.65. Of the 10% of entering freshmen who submitted high school class rank, 26% were in the top tenth of their graduating class, 57% in the top quarter, and 86% in the top half.

Faculty
As of May 2022, at least 19 UO faculty (living or deceased) have been elected to the National Academy of Sciences.

As of the fall of 2017, the university has 2,041 faculty members. Among this group there are 782 tenure and tenure-track (ladder) faculty members. Among US doctoral universities UO is ranked 80th when it come to full professor salaries. However, when other compensation measures are factored in, UO ranks 58th.

Research
The university is a member of the Association of American Universities, a group of leading research universities in the United States. It is also classified as a "Very High Research Activity" university, according to the Carnegie Classification of Institutions of Higher Education. UO has comparatively small research spending totals for an AAU level university. According to the National Science Foundation, Oregon spent $111 million on research and development in 2018, ranking it 151st in the nation.

The university has 19 research centers and institutes. The university also maintains nine "research core facilities".

Organization

Accreditation
The university is accredited by the Northwest Commission on Colleges and Universities, which is recognized by the United States Department of Education.

University governance
The university's internal governance is conducted in accordance with The Constitution of the University of Oregon. The UO Constitution provides a collaborative process that ensures a strong voice for the faculty, acting through the University Senate. The representation of students, civil servants, and administrative employees in the senate ensures this predominantly faculty body operates in the best interests of the entire university community.

UO Board of Trustees assumed control in 2014. The trustees have the broad authority to supervise and manage the university and may exercise all the powers, rights, duties and privileges expressly granted by law or that are implied by law or are incident to the board's powers, rights, duties and privileges.

Former provost Scott Coltrane served as interim president, from August 6, 2014, through June 30, 2015, following the resignation of Michael Gottfredson. This resignation occurred with less than 24 hours notice amidst a number of controversies, including allegations of mishandling of sexual violence, a decline of $100 million in university donations, and the alienation of faculty members around unionization and academic freedom. Including one interim president, Gottfredson was the university's fourth president in six years, a situation that led Chronicle of Higher Education to label the position a "revolving door."

On April 14, 2015 Michael H. Schill was named president, with a start date of July 1, 2015.

On August 11, 2022, it was announced that Schill was leaving the university to become president at Northwestern University.

On August 16, 2022, the Board of Trustees of the University of Oregon voted unanimously to appoint provost and senior vice president Patrick Phillips as interim president of the university during a special board meeting.

On March 13, 2023, the Board of Trustees unanimously voted to select John Karl Scholz as the 19th university president. Scholz is currently the provost of the University of Wisconsin–Madison and an economics professor. James Moffitt, the university's chief financial officer will serve as the interim president until Scholz takes office in July, replacing Phillips.

Budget
UO's FY14 operating revenue total $905 million. , the estimated economic impact of the University of Oregon is $2.6 billion annually. Despite a large increase in undergraduate enrollment, state appropriations are less than what they were 10 years prior. The university also receives less state support than many of its peers. According to FY13-14 data from the AAU, UO ranks last in state funding and receives approximately $47.8 million from the state.

Campus safety and security

Campus security is enforced by the University of Oregon Police Department. The department was known as the Department of Public Safety. Formerly a campus security force, the department transitioned to its new role in 2012.

The University of Oregon also appeared in the documentary The Hunting Ground after allowing three basketball players accused of sexual assault to play in an NCAA Tournament. The documentary focuses on campus rape in higher education institutions in the United States.

Sexual assaults

In 2018 there were 8 rapes on campus as reported by the Department of Education.

Drug and alcohol abuse

In 2018 there were 364 drug abuse violations on campus and 894 liquor law violations on campus.

Campus

Additionally, the campus is an arboretum consisting of 500 species of trees. In total there are over 3,000 trees on campus. It is adjacent to the West University neighborhood and Pioneer Cemetery. Eugene is near many prominent geographic features such as the Willamette River, Cascade Mountains and the Pacific Ocean. Also within a two-hour drive is the Portland metropolitan area.

The campus is occupied by approximately 80 buildings. However, there are several ongoing construction projects, as well as plans to build new facilities. The campus is the home of the Oregon Bach Festival.

Based on Ellis F. Lawrence's vision, many of the university's buildings are planned around several major quadrangles, many of which abut the 13th Avenue pedestrian mall. The university is known for being the site of a pioneering participatory planning experiment known as the Oregon Experiment, which is also the subject of a book of the same name that evolved into the well known book A Pattern Language by Christopher Alexander. The project's two major principles are buildings should be designed, in part, by the people who will use them with the help of an "architect facilitator", and construction should occur over many small projects as opposed to a few large ones.

Although academic buildings are spread throughout the campus, most are along East 13th Avenue, with heavy pedestrian traffic at the intersection with Kincaid Street. Student recreation and union centers are toward the center of the campus, with residence halls on the east side. Sports facilities are grouped in the southern-central part of campus with the Autzen Stadium and PK Park complexes across the Willamette River. The university also owns and operates several satellite facilities, including a large facility in the White Stag Block of downtown Portland and the Oregon Institute of Marine Biology in Charleston, Oregon.

The campus has been smoke and tobacco free since 2012.

Old campus and memorial quad

The oldest section of campus is in the northwest area of the current campus. The university's first building, University Hall, opened on October 16, 1876, when the university had an enrollment of 177 students. It was known as "the building" before being named after Judge Matthew Deady in 1893. The second building on campus is known as Villard Hall and is home to the Theater Arts and Comparative Literature Departments. Completed in 1886, the hall was named after railroad magnate Henry Villard, who provided financial aid to the university in 1881. Before its naming, it was known as "the new building." Both University and Villard Halls were designated National Historic Landmarks in 1977.

Just south of Old Campus is the Memorial Quad, which runs north and south along Kincaid Street, capped at both ends by the main campus library, Knight Library, on the south side, and the Lillis Business Complex on the north. It is flanked on the west by the tallest building on campus, Prince Lucien Campbell Hall, also known as "PLC", Condon Hall on the west, housing the Geography department, and the Jordan Schnitzer Museum of Art on the east, which was remodeled and reopened on January 23, 2005. Also adjacent to Memorial Quad is Chapman Hall, which houses the Robert D. Clark Honors College.

Central campus

The center of campus houses a mixture of academic buildings, an administration building, and student recreation buildings. Just to the east of Memorial Quad, facing 13th Avenue is Johnson Hall where offices for higher administration and trustee offices are found, including the offices of the university president. Directly across 13th Avenue, facing Johnson Hall is "The Pioneer" a statue of a bearded, buckskin-clad pioneer cast in bronze by sculptor Alexander Phimister Proctor in 1919. In 1932, Proctor's "Pioneer Mother" statue was dedicated in the Women's Memorial Quadrangle on the other side of Johnson Hall; the two statues are aligned so they can "see" one another through the large windows of the hall's main floor.

Lawrence Hall is at the end of hardscape walkway, directly north of the intersection of 13th Avenue and University Street. It houses the School of Architecture and Allied Arts and is named after its first dean, Ellis F. Lawrence, in 1957. Allen Hall, opened in 1954, is adjacent to Lawrence Hall and houses the School of Journalism and Communication.

Additionally, Erb Memorial Union and the recreation center are in this part of campus.

Lorry I. Lokey Science Complex and east campus

The Lorry I. Lokey Science Complex comprises multiple science buildings to the east of Lawrence Hall, on the north side of 13th Avenue. Willamette Hall's Paul Olum Atrium is the center of the university's hard sciences complex. The construction of the $45.6 million additions of Willamette Hall, home of the physics department; Cascade Hall, home of the geology department; Deschutes Hall, home of the Computer and Information Science Department; and Streisinger Hall to the complex were completed in 1989.

Within the Lokey Science Complex are two facilities focused on integrative science. One is the Lokey Laboratories, which is a shared-use facility with state-of-the-art characterization instrumentation. Lokey Laboratories is associated with the Oregon Nanoscience and Microtechnologies Institute (ONAMI) and was dedicated to Lorry I. Lokey on February 19, 2008, for his $25 million donation toward the project. It is underground, beneath the quad between Heustis and Deschutes Halls, to minimize vibrations. The newest building, the Lewis Integrative Science Building, sits at the north end of this quad and opened in the fall of 2012. Immediately to the east of the Lokey Science Complex is Oregon Hall, which houses administrative offices including the Office of the Registrar and Office of Admissions.

The Allan Price Science Commons and Research Library is also within the Lokey Science Complex. It underwent a major renovation and expansion with the new building reopening in 2016.

The northeast corner of campus is home to the Ford Alumni Center and Matthew Knight Arena. Most of the rest of the eastern part of campus is dedicated to residence halls. Carson Hall, near the Erb Memorial Union, provides dining services along with dormitories. Just south is the Living-Learning Center, opened in 2006. It is a collection of functions including dormitories, classrooms, study areas, dining rooms, and recreational rooms to provide a single location for many student activities. The newest residence hall, the Global Scholars Hall, opened in the fall of 2012. It primarily houses returning students and students enrolled in the Robert D. Clark Honors College, College Scholars, and the global scholars language programs.

South campus

The center of south campus is where much of the on-campus athletic facilities reside. Hayward Field, home to the Ducks track and field program, sits in the eastern area of the athletic facilities. It has hosted a number of prominent track and field events such as the US Track and Field Olympic Trials, the NCAA Track and Field Championships, and USATF Championships.

To the west of the athletic facilities lies Pioneer Cemetery and further west is where the current facilities for the College of Education exists, in the southwest corner of campus. The HEDCO Education building and the Frohnmayer Music Center are in the vicinity. The Knight Law Center is just opposite of Hayward Field in the southeast corner of campus. The Many Nations Longhouse and the Museum of Natural and Cultural History are East of Knight Law.

Knight Campus
The Phil and Penny Knight Campus for Accelerating Scientific Impact is a future billion dollar applied science campus. The campus will consist of three state-of-the-art research facilities. The campus will be on the north side of Franklin Boulevard.

UO supporters Phil and Penny Knight will donate $500 million towards the endeavor over ten years. The rest of the funding is expected to come from state bonds and private support.

Other areas and satellites
The controversial Riverfront Research Park is a small facility maintained by the university, across Franklin Boulevard from the main campus, next to the Willamette River. The park is used for creating new technologies, such as research about artificial intelligence at the Computational Intelligence Research Lab, and it is the home of the Zebrafish Information Network (ZFIN), the zebrafish model organism database. Local controversy has existed since before the development and approval of the site master plan by the City of Eugene in 1989. Controversy stems from the lack of citizen involvement in the planning process for the use of public lands, and the potential for multi-story office buildings and parking lots to replace open space, civic space, and wildlife habitat along the Willamette River. The university and student senates have each passed resolutions against construction on the banks of the Willamette River under the current development plan, yet plans for development persist. In March 2010, the issue of a conditional use permit extension for the Research Park was appealed to the Land Use Board of Appeals by a group of citizens, students, and faculty.

The complex for the Ducks football and baseball team is north across the Willamette River. It includes the football stadium (Autzen Stadium), the baseball park (PK Park), an indoor practice football field (Moshofsky Center), a soccer field (Pape Field), an outdoor practice field (Kilkenny Field), and the Casanova Center which includes offices, the athletics Hall of Fame, locker rooms, weight rooms, a film review theater, and a treatment center.

UO Portland
The university also leases space in Old Town Portland in the White Stag Block. UO-Portland provides an urban study environment for the School of Architecture and Allied Arts, the School of Journalism and Communication, the School of Law, and the Lundquist College of Business. Additionally, the Division of Continuing Education, the Labor Education Resource Center, and the Department of Athletics have active offices there. The Duck Store has a 
shop in the building.

In 2022, UO purchased the campus of the now closed Concordia University. In 2023, most of UO's academic programs located in Portland will be relocated to this campus.

Sustainability
The undergraduate architecture program is consistently ranked among the highest in the country, and is currently ranked as the #1 public program for "Sustainable Design Practice and Principles" by DesignIntelligence magazine.

The University of Oregon received a grade of "B+" from the Sustainable Endowments Institute on its last published College Sustainability Report Card in 2011.

There has also been a push for sustainable buildings on campus with a development plan that requires any new building or renovation to incorporate sustainable design. The Lillis Business Complex was the catalyst for the policy. The building, completed in 2003 has earned a LEED Silver rating, the highest rating of any college business building in the United States. , there were 15 different buildings on campus that have been awarded LEED Silver or above ratings.

The Green Product Design Network was created by a group of leaders from the UO with expertise in green chemistry, product design, business, communications, and journalism.

Libraries and museums

The multi-branch University of Oregon Libraries serves the campus with library collections, instruction and reference, and a wide variety of educational technology and media services. The UO is Oregon's only member of the Association of Research Libraries. The main branch, the Knight Library, houses humanities and social sciences, Learning Commons, Music Services, Government Publications, Maps and Aerial Photos, Special Collections & University Archives, Media Services, the Center for Educational Technologies, and a Cinema Studies lab to be available in Winter 2010. Other branch locations are:
 The Design Library in Lawrence Hall (renamed "Design" from the "Architecture & Allied Arts Library" when the school changed its name to the College of Design in summer of 2017)
 The John E. Jaqua Law Library in the Knight Law Center
 The Loyd & Dorothy Rippey Library at the Oregon Institute of Marine Biology in Charleston, Oregon.
 The Mathematics Library in Fenton Hall
 The Portland Library & Learning Commons in the White Stag Block in Portland, Oregon
 The Science Library in the Price Science Commons

The UO Libraries hosts Scholars' Bank, an open access (OA) digital repository created to capture, distribute and preserve the intellectual output of the University of Oregon. Scholars' Bank uses open-source DSpace software developed by Massachusetts Institute of Technology and Hewlett-Packard.

The Libraries' Educational Video Group maintains the UO Channel, which uses streaming media to provide access to campus lectures, interviews, performances, symposia, and documentary productions.

The UO is the founding member and host of the Orbis-Cascade Alliance, a consortium of academic and research libraries in Oregon, Washington and Idaho. The combined collections of the Alliance exceed 20 million volumes and can be searched via the Summit union catalog. The Orbis Cascade Alliance serves faculty and the equivalent of more than 258,000 full-time students. In addition to its members, the Alliance extends selected services to more than 280 libraries, museums, archives, and historical societies in seven western states.

The Special Collections & University Archives house a collection of Gardner Fox's literary manuscripts, comic books, and other materials, including over 200 letters from fans. It is also the home to a rare collection of thousands of Japanese senjafuda (votive slips), part of the Gertrude Bass Warner Collection.

The University of Oregon is home to the Jordan Schnitzer Museum of Art and the Museum of Natural and Cultural History.

There are multiple galleries around the main campus, including (but not limited to):
 The LaVerne Krause Gallery in Lawrence Hall
 The Adell McMillan Gallery in the Erb Memorial Union
 The Aperture Gallery in the Erb Memorial Union
 The art gallery on the second floor of the Knight Law Center
 The Washburn Gallery in the FAS Ceramics building.

Campus life and events

Special events
UO is home to various special events. One of the most popular and well-known events held on campus is the Oregon Bach Festival. The festival is a donor-sponsored program of the university and the only major music festival affiliated with an American university. Founded in 1970 by German conductor Helmuth Rilling and UO professor (and past president of the American Choral Directors Association) Royce Saltzman, the festival has grown into an international program that draws hundreds of musicians and over 40,000 attendees annually. The festival's focus is choral and orchestral music, and it hosts a professional choir and orchestra each year to perform major works by Bach and other composers; it also sponsors a master class in conducting that draws participants from around the world.

The festival has presented such artists as Frederica von Stade, Bobby McFerrin, Garrison Keillor, and Thomas Quasthoff, who made his American debut in Eugene in 1995. The festival actively commissions and premieres new choral-orchestra works, including pieces by Arvo Pärt, Osvaldo Golijov, and Tan Dun. A Bach Festival recording of the world-premiere performance of Krzyztof Penderecki's Credo won the 2001 Grammy Award for best choral performance.

Another popular event held on campus is the men's and women's track and field Olympics Trials. This event has been held on campus for the last three qualifying years (2008, 2012, 2016). Additionally, they have been held five times in all on campus.

Furthermore, the campus is hosting the 2021 World Championships in Athletics.

Clubs and groups
There are more than 250 student groups at the University of Oregon, most of which are headquartered in the Erb Memorial Union.

In addition to its athletic teams, the university has a competitive intercollegiate Speech and Debate team. The University of Oregon Forensics program was founded in 1876, at the same time as the university. Initially the program consisted of two student-formed forensic societies, which developed into "doughnut league" inter-dorm competitions in the 1890s. In 1891, the UO began intercollegiate competition. Forensics continued to grow as a staple of the university's community and by 1911, the team was so successful that it began charging admission to debates. Money raised during these events was often donated to the fledgling University of Oregon football program.

Parliamentary debate was integrated into UO Forensics in 1998–99 and the team has been competitive since. In 2001, the UO's Alan Tauber and Heidi Ford claimed a national title, winning the first ever National Parliamentary Tournament of Excellence (NPTE). In 2011, the team of Matt Gander and Hank Fields claimed both national titles, winning the NPTE and the National Parliamentary Debate Association Championship, coached by Thomas Schally, Benjamin Dodds, Sarah Hamid, and Will Chamberlain.

The University of Oregon is home to three student-run a cappella groups: Divisi, a treble ensemble; On the Rocks, a TTBB ensemble; and Mind the Gap, a mixed ensemble. All three groups have competed numerous times in the International Championship of Collegiate A Cappella (ICCA). On the Rocks placed 3rd at ICCA finals in 2002 and 2nd in 2003. Divisi has competed at ICCA finals three times – the only treble ensemble in the world to do so – in 2005, where they placed 2nd, as well as 2010 and 2016. In 2020, The A Cappella Archive ranked Divisi at #14 all-time among ICCA-competing groups, as well as the highest-ranked treble ensemble.

Media

The University of Oregon has a diverse array of student-run and student-created media, including the Daily Emerald, the Oregon Commentator, and Ethos Magazine, among others.

The university is also home of two radio stations: KWAX (classical music) and KWVA (campus radio). For a more exhaustive list of campus media organizations, please see the above linked article.

Government

The Associated Students of the University of Oregon (ASUO) is the student government at the University of Oregon. It is a non-profit organization funded by the University of Oregon. Its purpose is to provide for the social, cultural, educational and physical development of its members, and for the advancement of their individual and collective interests both within and without the university. Membership consists of all students at the University of Oregon, who have paid the current term or semester student incidental fee.

Student participation in governance of the university extends to membership in the University Senate, which has five student members with full voting rights plus the ASUO president as a nonvoting member. Students are also represented on the university's board of trustees by a voting member appointed by the Governor of Oregon.

The total FY2014-15 ASUO budget was $15.24 million.

Graduate Teaching Fellows Federation
The University of Oregon Graduate Teaching Fellows Federation (GTFF) was established in 1976 to represent graduate student workers and it is one of the oldest graduate student unions in the U.S. The UO administration objected to the establishment of the union, citing that graduate workers were "students, not employees." The Oregon Employment Relations Board (ERB) ruled in favor of the graduate students and supported their right to organize. The GTFF began organizing its first contract in April 1977 and reached a negotiation with the university administration after two strike votes. In 1993, the GTFF successfully bargained for employer-paid health insurance.

In 2014, the GTFF went on strike for the first time. In October, GTFF members voted to authorize a strike over two issues not yet included in the GTF contract: a pay raise to the minimum GTF salary and a form of paid sick leave. The strike lasted a week and overlapped with the university's administration of final examinations. Although the union members accused the university administration of strike breaking activities, intimidation of international students, and unlawful demands, a compromise was reach on December 10 and the strike ended.

Facilities and housing
The Erb Memorial Union (EMU) is the student union, which functions as a center for student life. It sits on the southeast corner of 13th and University St. The EMU underwent a $95 million renovation and expansion project from 2013 to 2016. The wing, built in 1973 was demolished in 2014 to make way for a new wing. Opened in the fall of 2016, the new facility includes improved dining options, faculty and group offices, and meeting spaces. It also features a campus pub operated by local brewery Falling Sky. There is also a bike-share program, multi-purpose auditorium, and craft center.

South of the Erb Memorial Union across a small quad is the Student Recreational Center (SRC) which is an exercise and recreation facility. It includes fitness equipment, rock climbing walls, a swimming pool, racquetball courts, an indoor elevated running track and basketball courts. Tennis courts, turf fields, and a running track are outdoors next to the Rec Center. The facility reopened in early 2015 after a major renovation and expansion. The Lyllye Reynolds-Parker Black Cultural Center, named in honor of alumna, civil rights activist, and counselor Lyllye-Reynolds Parker, opened in October 2019.

The current Residence Halls are: Barnhart, Bean, Carson, Earl, the Global Scholars Hall, Hamilton, Kalapuya Ilihi, the Living-Learning Center, Riley, and Walton. The newest residence hall, Kalapuya Ilihi, opened in the Fall of 2017 and is named in honor of the indigenous Kalapuya tribe who lived in the Eugene area. Kalapuya Ilihi opened next to Global Scholars Hall, and hosts 531 students, as well as includes an open-space for students and faculty on the ground floor. Additionally, several residence halls are expected to undergo major renovations in the near future.

Traditions
 A cappella groups perform at the venue in front of the EMU on Friday afternoons.
 "It never rains at Autzen stadium." – It is a tradition for the announcer to call this out sometime during each football game.
 Street Fair – Twice a year, a street fair lines the entire stretch of the University of Oregon campus on 13th Street. It features exceptional food and plenty of arts and crafts.
 Each year in May there is University Day, a campus-wide effort by students and faculty/staff to beautify the grounds. It is a single day filled with planting trees, flowers, cleaning up landscapes and making the campus more presentable for the upcoming graduation ceremonies. In 1905 this event replaced the rowdy, destructive and sometimes violent class-on-class Flag Rush days.
 Each year, the university community hikes up Skinner Butte to paint the Big "O" overlooking Eugene.
 Many people make "O" gestures with their hands to show support for the university.
 The Canoe Fete, one of the most beloved past traditions of the university, took place on the Eugene millrace.

Athletics

The University of Oregon is a member of the Pac-12 Conference and the Division I Football Bowl Subdivision of the NCAA. The athletic programs have garnered 28 NCAA team championships, as well as 60 NCAA individual champions in various track and field events. The strength of the track program, as well as its connection to Nike, has made Eugene known as "Track Town, USA". The two primary rivals of the Oregon Ducks football team are the Washington Huskies and the Oregon State Beavers, though they also have a strong rivalry with the Washington State Cougars. The football rivalry with Oregon State University is one of the nation's oldest. Every year, the two teams face off in the last game of the regular season. The two teams have faced each other nearly every year since 1894 except for five years. Games were not held in 1900, 1901, 1911, 1943, and 1944.

The university competes in 14 sports: football, men's and women's basketball, cross country, track and field, baseball, softball, men's and women's tennis, men's and women's golf, women's soccer, women's lacrosse, women's volleyball, and acrobatics & tumbling. This does not include club sports which competes at the Division I level in Rugby, Soccer, Rowing, and Waterpolo. As well as women's Division I club athletics in Rowing, Rugby, and Waterpolo.

With 20 NCAA championships between them, cross country and track and field are the two programs at the university that have enjoyed the most success. The programs have produced many world-class athletes including Steve Prefontaine and Alberto Salazar, the latter of whom was also a coach until he was banned for life. Nike had been formed by the former track and field head coach Bill Bowerman and former University of Oregon track runner Phil Knight. The successes of the programs have given the name of Track Town, USA to Eugene.

Created in 1893, the football team played its first game in 1894 and won its first Rose Bowl in 1917 against the University of Pennsylvania. The 1938–39 men's basketball team, nicknamed the "Tall Firs," won the first-ever NCAA basketball tournament by defeating Ohio State in the March 28, 1939 championship game.

Originally recognized as an official sport at the university in 1908, baseball was disbanded in 1981 due to concerns with Title IX. In 2007, the athletic director Patrick Kilkenny announced plans to reinstate baseball and to drop wrestling while adding women's acrobatics & tumbling.

Relationship with Nike

The Athletic Department (AD) and university (UO) have a long and complex relationship with Nike Inc. The corporation has significant historical ties to UO. It was founded by two UO alumni. Nike founder Phil Knight is also one of the largest benefactors in the history of UO. In recent years he has invested heavily in developing and maintaining the athletic apparatus.

Mascot

The mascot of the University of Oregon is the fighting duck. The popular Disney character Donald Duck has been the mascot for decades, thanks to a handshake agreement between then-Athletic Director Leo Harris and Walt Disney in 1947. The mascot has been challenged more than a few times in its lifetime. The first came in 1966 when Walt Disney died and the company realized there was no formal contract written for the use of Donald's image. A formal contract was written up in 1973. Potential heirs "Mallard Drake" and "Mandrake" challenged Donald's position in 1978 and 2003 respectively, but both were unpopular and discontinued.

Song

The fight song is "Mighty Oregon", written by professor Albert Perfect and student John DeWitt Gilbert in 1916. It has undergone several changes since its original performance.

 In fiction and popular culture 

Onscreen
The film National Lampoon's Animal House (1978) was filmed on the university campus and the surrounding area. The building used as the exterior of the Delta House (which belonged to the University of Oregon Pi Kappa Alpha chapter) was demolished in 1986, but the interior scenes were shot in the Sigma Nu house, which still stands. The Omega house belongs to the Alpha Sigma Phi fraternity and still stands. The sorority house where Bluto climbs the ladder to peek in on the female students was actually the exterior of the Sigma Nu fraternity. Other buildings used during filming include Johnson Hall, Gerlinger Hall, Fenton Hall, Carson Hall, and the Erb Memorial Union (EMU). The EMU dining facility known as "The Fishbowl" was the site of the famous food-fight scene. The Knight Library and the Jordan Schnitzer Museum of Art can also be seen in the movie.

Other films shot at the university include
 Abe Lincoln in Illinois (1940)
 Five Easy Pieces (1970)
 Drive, He Said (1970)
 How to Beat the High Cost of Living (1980)
 Personal Best (1982)
 Stand By Me (1986) (shot primarily in nearby Brownsville)
 Without Limits (1998)
 Zerophilia (2005)

People

Alumni

Alumni include at least two Nobel Laureates, five members of the National National Academy of Sciences,  16 Pulitzer Prize winners, who have won a combined 20 awards, 19 Rhodes Scholars and 5 Marshall Scholars.

There are more than 195,000 University of Oregon alumni around the world. The Ford Alumni Center, adjacent to Matthew Knight Arena, houses an interactive exhibit. The UO Alumni Association is also based out of this facility.

Prominent alumni include:  academic leaders Lee Bollinger (president of Columbia University and former president of the University of Michigan), Gene Block (chancellor of UCLA), and Asher Cohen (president of the Hebrew University of Jerusalem), TV host Ann Curry, author and counter-culture figure Ken Kesey (One Flew Over the Cuckoo's Nest), businessman Phil Knight (founded Nike, Inc. in Eugene), NFL quarterbacks Marcus Mariota (2014 Heisman Trophy winner) and Justin Herbert (2019 William V. Campbell Trophy recipient and 2020 NFL Offensive Rookie of the Year), screenwriter Stephen J. Cannell,  author Chuck Palahniuk (Fight Club), cognitive scientist and author Douglas Hofstadter (Gödel, Escher, Bach), U.S. Senator Ron Wyden, American sportscaster and former professional football player Ahmad Rashad, professional basketball players Luke Ridnour, Luke Jackson and Sabrina Ionescu, former American football quarterback and current sportscaster Dan Fouts, actress Kaitlin Olson, Circuit Court Judge Hollie Pihl, A cappella vocalist and YouTuber Peter Hollens, trumpeter and musician Tony Glausi,  Hilda Heine (president of the Marshall Islands), and Coach Mark Few (coach of Men's Basketball Gonzaga Bulldogs.)

Faculty and staff

Current University of Oregon faculty and researchers include 1 Nobel Prize laureate, and 11 members of the National Academy of Sciences Furthermore, two Oregon based researchers have been awarded the President's National Medal of Science.

Notable current and former faculty and staff include: renowned Canadian architect Arthur Erikson, biochemist and biophysicist Brian Matthews (also known for Matthews correlation coefficient), neuroscientist Michael Posner, behavioural psychologist and risk researcher Paul Slovic, molecular biologist and geneticist Franklin Stahl (noted for Meselson–Stahl experiment) which he performed at Caltech, molecular biologist George Streisinger (pioneered the use of Zebrafish in biological research), and 2012 Nobel Prize in Physics winner Knight Research Professor David Wineland, formerly of NIST and the University of Colorado Boulder.

Notable current and former athletic department staff include: track coach Bill Bowerman (known for co-founding Nike, Inc.) and football coach Chip Kelly (also known for coaching Philadelphia Eagles and San Francisco 49ers).

 See also 

Oregon Student AssociationOregon Exchanges'', a newspaper covering the news industry in Oregon, published in the early 20th century.

Notes

References

Further reading

 * Annual Catalogue of the State University of Oregon, 1886–1887. Portland, OR: George H. Himes, 1887. —Includes several annual catalogs listing professors, alumni, students, and college rules.

External links

 
 Oregon Athletics website

 
1876 establishments in Oregon
Flagship universities in the United States
Education in Eugene, Oregon
Educational institutions established in 1876
University and college buildings on the National Register of Historic Places in Oregon
Universities and colleges accredited by the Northwest Commission on Colleges and Universities
Tourist attractions in Eugene, Oregon
National Register of Historic Places in Eugene, Oregon
University of Oregon